Ademar dos Santos Batista (born 21 March 1983), known simply as Ademar, is a Brazilian professional footballer who plays as a striker.

Career 
Ademar formerly played for BC Augsburg and Botafogo. He was loaned to Estácio in 2007.

References

1983 births
Living people
Expatriate footballers in Germany
Botafogo de Futebol e Regatas players
Americano Futebol Clube players
Association football forwards
Footballers from Rio de Janeiro (city)
Brazilian footballers